The education system in Israel consists of three tiers: primary education (grades 1–6, approximately ages 6–12), middle school (grades 7–9, approximately ages 12–15) and high school (grades 10–12, approximately ages 15–19). Compulsory education takes place from kindergarten through 10th grade. The school year begins on September 1 (September 2 if September 1 is on Saturday), ending for elementary school pupils on June 30 (June 29 if June 30 is on Saturday), and for middle school and high school pupils on June 20 (June 19 if June 20 is on Saturday). Haredi Yeshivas follow an independent schedule, starting on 1 Elul.

Israeli culture views higher education as the key to higher mobility and socioeconomic status in Israeli society. For millennia medieval European antisemitism often forbade the Jews from owning land and farming, which limited their career choices for making a decent living. This forced many Jews to place a much higher premium on education allowing them to seek alternative career options that involved entrepreneurial and white-collar professional pursuits such as merchant trading, science, medicine, law, accountancy, and moneylending as these professions required higher levels of verbal, mathematical, and scientific literacy. The emphasis of education within Israeli society has its modern roots at least since the Jewish diaspora from the Renaissance and Enlightenment Movement all the way to the roots of Zionism in the 1880s. Jewish communities in the Levant were the first to introduce compulsory education for which the organized community, not less than the parents, was responsible for the education of the next generation. With contemporary Jewish culture's strong emphasis, promotion of scholarship and learning and the strong propensity to promote cultivation of intellectual pursuits as well as the nation's high university educational attainment rate exemplifies how highly Israeli society values higher education.

Israel's populace is well educated and Israeli society highly values education. Education is a core value in Jewish culture and in Israeli society at large with many Israeli parents sacrificing their own personal comforts and financial resources to provide their children with the highest standards of education possible. Much of the Israeli Jewish population seek education as a passport to a decent white collar professional job and a middle class paycheck in the country's competitive high-tech economy. Jewish parents take great responsibility to inculcate the value of education in their children at a young age. Striving for high academic achievement and educational success is stressed in many modern Jewish Israeli households as parents make sure that their children are well educated adequately in order to gain the necessary technological skills needed for employment success to compete in Israel's modern high-tech job market. Israelis see competency with in demand job skills such as literacy in math and science as especially necessary for employment success in Israel's competitive 21st-century high-tech economy. Israel's Jewish population maintains a relatively high level of educational attainment where just under half of all Israeli Jews (46%) hold post-secondary degrees. This figure has remained stable in their already high levels of educational attainment over recent generations. Israeli Jews (among those ages 25 and older) have average of 11.6 years of schooling making them one of the most highly educated of all major religious groups in the world. In Arab, Christian and Druze schools, the exam on Biblical studies is replaced by an exam on Muslim, Christian or Druze heritage. Maariv described the Christian Arabs sectors as "the most successful in education system", since Christians fared the best in terms of education in comparison to any other religion in Israel. Israeli children from Russian-speaking families have a higher bagrut pass rate at high-school level. Although amongst immigrant children born in the Former Soviet Union, the bagrut pass rate is highest amongst those families from European FSU states at 62.6%, and lower amongst those from Central Asian and Caucasian FSU states. In 2014, 61.5% of all Israeli twelfth graders earned a matriculation certificate.

As the Israeli economy is largely scientific and technological based, the labor market demands people who have achieved some form of higher education, particularly related to science and engineering in order to gain a competitive edge when searching for employment. In 2012, the country ranked second among OECD countries (tied with Japan and after Canada) for the percentage of 25 to 64-year-olds that have attained tertiary education with 46 percent compared with the OECD average of 32 percent. In addition, nearly twice as many Israelis aged 55–64 held a higher education degree compared to other OECD countries, with 47 percent holding an academic degree compared with the OECD average of 25%. It ranks fifth among OECD countries for the total expenditure on educational institutions as a percentage of GDP. In 2011, the country spent 7.3% of its GDP on all levels of education, comparatively more than the Organisation for Economic Cooperation and Development average of 6.3% and as a result has fostered an education system that helped transform the country and rapidly grow its economy over the past 70 years.

The Israeli education system has been praised for various reasons, including its high quality and its major role in spurring Israel's economic development and technological boom. Many international business leaders and organizations such as Microsoft founder Bill Gates and the technology giant IBM have praised Israel for its high quality of education in helping spur Israel's economic development.

Educational tracks

Israeli schools are divided into four different tracks: state-secular (Mamlachti), state-religious (Mamlachti dati), independent religious (חרדי Haredi or חינוך עצמאי Ḥinuch Atzmai), and Arab. There are also private schools which reflect the philosophies of specific groups of parents (Democratic Schools), or that are based on the curriculum of a foreign country (e.g., The American International School in Israel). The majority of Israeli children attend state schools. State-religious schools, catering to youngsters from the Orthodox sector (mainly Religious Zionist/Modern Orthodox), offer intensive Jewish studies programs, and emphasize tradition and observance. The Chinuch Atzmai schools focus almost entirely on Torah study and offer very little in terms of secular subjects. Schools in the Arab sector teach in Arabic, and offer a curriculum that emphasizes Arab history, religion, and culture.

The proportions of pupils attending schools in the Haredi and Arab sectors are increasing; according to a demographic study published in 2009, Haredim and Arabs together will amount to 60% of Israel's elementary school population by 2030. Haredim and Arab citizens are underrepresented in both the Israel Defense Forces and the workforce, since both groups are exempt from the otherwise compulsory military service, and in many Haredi sects men choose to focus only on religious studies throughout their life and rely financially on support from co-religionists, the State, etc.

The Haredim's lack of mainstream education, and consequent low participation in the workforce, are regarded by many in Israel as a social problem. The Council for Higher Education announced in 2012 that it was investing NIS 180 million over the following five years to establish appropriate frameworks for the education of Haredim, focusing on specific professions. Israel's Ministry of Education's statistics from 2014 show that only about 22 percent of Haredi students take matriculation exams, since Orthodox yeshivot mostly ignore core subjects. About 8 percent of Haredi students pass the exam. Miriam Ben-Peretz, professor emeritus of education at the University of Haifa, and winner of the 2006 Israel Prize notes: “More and more Israeli students don't have any foundation of knowledge, any basics — not in math, not in English, not in general...things have to change." Some Israelis who have been educated in Haredi yeshivas have established Leaving for Change (LFC), an organization seeking to sue the government for alleged failure to enforce Israel's law for compulsory education.

In 1984, the first integrated schools which had both Jewish and Arab students coexisting in a classroom were built by the residents of Neve Shalom – Wāħat as-Salām, a cooperative village founded by Arab and Jewish citizens of Israel. Today, this school receives some support from the state. Two more integrated schools were opened in Jerusalem and Galilee (Galil Jewish-Arab School) in 1997 by Hand in Hand: Center for Jewish Arab Education in Israel. As of 2010, there were five integrated schools in Israel, including Neve Shalom.

Israeli Pupils’ Rights Law
The Israeli Pupils’ Rights Law of 2000 prohibits discrimination of students for sectarian reasons in admission to or expulsion from an educational institution, in establishment of separate educational curricula or holding of separate classes in the same educational institution, and addresses rights and obligations of pupils. The law was fully supported by the Israeli Student and Youth Council However, discrimination still exists: in 2005, the municipality of Lod refused to allow a three-year-old Arab child to register in a Jewish kindergarten.

Matriculation (Bagrut)

High schools in Israel prepare students for the Israeli matriculation exams (bagrut). These are exams covering various academic disciplines, which are studied in one to five (sometimes up to 10) units (yehidot limud), usually of ascending difficulty. Students with a passing mark on the mandatory matriculation subjects (Hebrew language, English language, mathematics, scripture, history, state studies and literature), who have been tested on at least 21 units, and passed at least one 5-unit exam, receive a full matriculation certificate. In 2006/7, 74.4% of Israeli 12th graders took the bagrut exams while only 46.3% were eligible for a matriculation certificate. In the Arab and Druze sectors, the figures were 35.6% and 43.7% respectively.

A Bagrut certificate and Bagrut scores often determine acceptance into elite military units, admission to academic institutions, and job prospects.

Below is a table illustrating the percentage of matriculation certificate recipients in Israel's largest cities, according to the Israel Central Bureau of Statistics (graduation year of 2002).

The Adva Center, a social issues think tank in Israel, says that about 15% of the matriculation certificates issued do not qualify the recipient for admission to Israel's universities.

Christian Arabs tend to have had the highest rates of success in the matriculation examinations, both in comparison to the Muslims and the Druze and in comparison to all students in the Jewish education system.

Higher education

After secondary education, students are generally conscripted into the Israel Defense Forces (IDF), but may request a postponement of the conscription date to study at a pre-service Mechina, undertake a voluntary service year, or study in a college or university. Those who study in a university at this stage generally do so under a program called atuda, where part of the tuition for their bachelor's degree is paid for by the army. They are however obliged to sign a contract with the army extending their service by 2–3 years.

Universities generally require a certain amount of bagrut matriculation units (as well as a certain grade average) and a good grade in the Psychometric Entrance Test, which is similar in many respects to the American SAT. The Open University of Israel accepts all applicants regardless of their academic history, though it still maintains high academic standards. All of Israel's nine public universities, and some of its colleges, are subsidized by the government, and students pay only a small part of the actual cost of tuition. Students who completed military service are entitled to a 90% discount on their first-year tuition fees. Further financial assistance is provided by student loans, grants, and scholarships approved by the Ministry of Education.

The Psychometric Entrance Test (colloquially known in Hebrew simply as "psychometry" - psixometri, פסיכומטרי) is a standardized test  used as a higher education admission exam. The PET covers three areas: quantitative reasoning, verbal reasoning and the English language. It is administered by the Israeli National Institute for Testing and Evaluation (NITE) and is heavily weighed for university admissions. The test may be taken in Hebrew, Arabic, Russian, French, Spanish, or combined Hebrew/English.

According to the OECD, the median age Israeli students complete their first degree is slightly above 27.

Comparisons and rankings

According to the Webometrics ranking, six of Israel's universities place in the top 100 schools of Asia. Four universities place in the top 150 in the world according to the Shanghai Jiao Tong University Academic Ranking of World Universities, and three are in the Times Higher Education-QS World University Rankings (i.e. amongst the "Top 200 World Universities"). Of note, the prestigious NYU, which enrolls the largest number of Jewish students of any public or private university in the United States, and is ranked in the top 34 globally in all major publications of university rankings, has a campus in Tel Aviv.

In addition, Israeli universities are among 100 of the top world universities in science and engineering-related subjects, according to the QS World University Rankings: mathematics (TAU, Hebrew University and Technion); physics (TAU, Hebrew University and Weizmann Institute of Science); chemistry (TAU, Hebrew University and Technion); computer science (TAU, Hebrew University, Weizmann Institute of Science, BIU and Technion); engineering (Technion); life sciences (Hebrew University).

In the social sciences, TAU and the Hebrew University rank in the top 100, and these universities are also ranked in the top 100 for economics; Israel is ranked 23rd on RePEc's Country and State Ranking for economics.

In 2010, Hebrew University reached 57th place in the global ranking list published by Shanghai Jiao Tong University in China.

Despite strong post-secondary rankings, Israel spends less per student than countries like Norway and Mexico.

Some officials have criticized the claim that the strong test scores prove Israel is a highly educated country, pointing out that scores from standardized tests exclude Haredi and special education students, and thus are not an accurate reflection. Israeli teachers must contend with large classes, low wages and low morale.
Despite this, Israel ranks second among OECD countries (tied with Japan and just after Canada) for the percentage of 25- to 64-year-olds that have achieved tertiary education: 46% compared with an OECD average of 32%. Inequality is a problem reflected in Israel's performance on international tests. In the latest PISA exams, in which half a million students from 65 countries participated, Israel ranked 33 in reading achievement and 40th in mathematics and science. Only Taiwan had larger gaps in the performance between the best and worst students.

Arab sector

Israel is a signatory of the Convention against Discrimination in Education, and ratified it in 1961. The convention has the status of law in Israeli courts.<ref name="hrw">Human Rights Watch, 'Second class: Discrimination against Palestinian Arab children in Israel's schools,  pp 13-16</ref>

Israel operates an Arab education system for the Israeli-Arab minority, teaching Arab students, in Arabic, about their history and culture. However, there have been claims that the Jewish education system gets more resources. According to the Follow-Up Committee for Arab Education, the Israeli government spends an average of $192 per year on each Arab student, and $1,100 per Jewish student. It also notes that drop-out rate for Israeli Arab citizens is twice as high as that of their Jewish counterparts (12 percent versus 6 percent). The same group also noted that in 2005, there was a 5,000-classroom shortage in the Arab sector.

In 1999, in attempt to close the gap between Arab and Jewish education sectors, the Israeli education minister, Yossi Sarid, announced an affirmative action policy, promising that Arabs would be granted 25% of the education budget, more than their proportional share in the population (18%). He also added that the ministry would support the creations of an Arab academic college.

In 2001, a Human Rights Watch report stated that students in government-run Arab schools received inferior education due to fewer teachers, inadequate school construction, and lack of libraries and recreational space. Jewish schools were found to be better equipped, some offering film editing studios and theater rooms. In 2009, Sorel Cahan of Hebrew University's School of Education claimed that the average per-student budget allocation for students with special needs at Arab junior high schools was five times lower.

In 2007, the Israeli Education Ministry announced a plan to increase funding for schools in Arab communities. According to a ministry official, "At the end of the process, a lot of money will be directed toward schools with students from families with low education and income levels, mainly in the Arab sector." The Education Ministry prepared a five-year plan to close the gaps and raise the number of students eligible for high school matriculation.

A 2009 report showed that obstacles to Arab students participating in higher education resulted in over 5,000 moving to study in nearby Jordan.Israel's Arab students are crossing to Jordan The National Apr 9, 2009 The Association for Civil Rights in Israel and various scholars have criticized wide disparities in education access between Jewish Israelis and Arab Israelis, and underfunding of Arab schools.Or Kashti, For Jews and Arabs, Israel's School System Remains Separate and Unequal, Haaretz (July 7, 2016).

The Ministry of Education announced in April 2010 that the suggested curriculum for the coming school year would not include civics, democratic values, or Jewish-Arab coexistence, and focus more on Zionist and Jewish values.

In 2010, the number of computer science teachers in the Arab sector rose by 50%. The Arab sector also saw a rise of 165% in instructors teaching technology classes and a 171% increase in the number teaching mathematics. The number of physics teachers in Arab schools grew by 25%, those teaching chemistry by 44% and in biology by 81.7%.

According to a 2012 report by the Higher Arab Monitoring Committee, there is a shortage of 6,100 classrooms and 4,000 teachers in Arab communities.

Christian Arabs tend to have had the highest rates of success in the matriculation examinations, both in comparison to the Muslims and the Druze, and in comparison to all students in the Jewish education system.  Arab Christians were also the vanguard in terms of eligibility for higher education, and they have attained a bachelor's degree and academic degree more than the median Israeli population. The rate of students studying in the field of medicine was also higher among the Christian Arab students, compared with all the students from other sectors. The percentage of Arab Christian women who are higher education students is higher than other sectors.

In 2011, the Council for Higher Education introduced a 5-Year Plan to increase accessibility to higher education among Arab, Druze and Circassian students.  The first plan ran through 2015/16, and was subsequently extended through 2021/22.  The plan is being implemented in 30 institutions of higher education that receive their budgets from the CHE's Planning and Budgeting Committee, and where the student body includes Arab, Druze, and Circassian students.  The program relates holistically to the many stages involved in succeeding in higher education: from providing information and guidance in grades 11 and 12, to offering pre-academic preparatory courses, to financial support while studying, to assistance in transitioning to the labor market.  There are scholarships for excellence in postgraduate studies and academic staff.  Beyond assistance to the individual students, a special effort is made to address the overall organizational culture of the institutions in terms of the degree to which they are culturally inclusive.Dalia Ben Rabi and Ayala Hendin. National Plan for Expanding Access of Arab, Druze and Circassian Students to Higher Education in Israel: Interim Report on the Support of Students as of the End of the 2015-16 School Year. Jerusalem: Myers-JDC-Brookdale Institute (2016).

Gender statistics
The dropout rate in grades 8–12 is higher for males than females. In 2011, the dropout rate declined, but was still higher among males, with 4.5% of male and 1.7% of female students dropping out of school. In addition, the passing rate of high school matriculation exams stood at 62% for females and 51% for males. The rate of women studying in universities and colleges is also higher; in 2011–2012, 56.7% of students at academic institutions were female. In 2012, women were also 59.3% of candidates for Master's degree programs and 52.4% for doctorate programs.

However, 81% of Israeli professors are men. In addition, fields such as engineering, electricity, physics, mathematics, computer science, and natural sciences are overwhelmingly male-dominated, though there are a large number of women in certain fields of engineering, such as biomedical, industrial, and environmental engineering. Women tend to study more in human and social sciences, such as education and occupational therapy.

Status of teachers
Over the years, government budget cuts have taken their toll. Israel was amongst the top-ranked nations in international rankings for science and mathematics performance in the 1960s, but dropped to 33 out of 41 nations in the 2002 survey. Wages for Israeli teachers are low compared to other industrialized countries, especially due to the small amount of frontal teaching hours with respect to other developed countries (the salary per hour is similar to that of the OECD standards), according to a survey of the Organisation for Economic Co-operation and Development. The government-appointed Dovrat Commission, led by Shlomo Dovrat, concluded in 2004, that the key to improving Israeli education is not more money but better-quality teaching. The recommendations included a reform giving school principals the right to fire teachers of poor quality, and reward better ones with higher pay. These moves have been blocked by Israel's teachers' unions, which have paralyzed schools with a series of long strikes, mostly blocking the proposed reforms.

Textbooks
According to a paper by Nurit Peled-Elhanan, a professor of language and education at the Hebrew University of Jerusalem,  textbooks in Israel promote a negative image of Arabs. The Center for Monitoring the Impact of Peace, a schoolbook monitoring organization, disputed this finding, calling her claim heavily politicized and distorted.

In a report published in 2000, the Center for Monitoring the Impact of Peace stated that in textbooks of both the general state-run network and the religious state-run network, there was a genuine effort to remove stereotypes and to build a foundation for coexistence and mutual respect.

According to a 2011 report by the Arab Cultural Association, Arabic textbooks provided to third to ninth grade students in Israeli schools were found to contain many mistakes. The report was based on a study of textbooks in all subjects. Dr. George Mansour, who examined the history textbooks, said they ignored the presence of Arab-Palestinians in Israel and minimized Arab culture.

Strikes
Israeli schools and universities have been subject to repeated strikes over the years by faculty, and, occasionally, by students. The 2007 Israeli student strike started in April 2007 in protest at the government decision to increase tuition fees and the failure to implement the 2001 Winograd Committee recommendation that they be reduced by 25%. After three weeks, the universities threatened that all students who failed to return to their studies would have to retake the semester. Student leaders rejected a compromise which would have exempted students from the fee rises. Some students started a hunger strike.
The strike ended on May 14 after student leaders accepted the implementation of the Shochat reforms. Middle and secondary school teachers were on strike for a month and a half. Their demands included an 8.5% pay raise, reducing class sizes to a maximum of 30 students, and increasing the length of the school day. The school year was extended until July 10, 2008 for all schools that participated in the strike.

Awards and recognition
Each year, municipalities may receive an award for outstanding education initiatives and accomplishments. The 2012 Education Prize of the Israeli Ministry of Education and Culture was awarded to the municipalities of Ariel, Ashdod, Yokneam, Ma'aleh Adumim, Safed and Kiryat Bialik. The educational networks of these cities were cited for their unique projects, effectiveness of immigrant absorption, student empowerment, educational leadership, top-quality teaching, encouragement of entrepreneurship and innovation, and promoting excellence in a diverse school population.

See also
Education Minister of Israel
List of universities and colleges in Israel
Science and technology in Israel
Scientific Leadership
First Step to Nobel Prize in Physics
Academic grading in Israel
Yeshiva#Israel

References

Further reading
 Agbaria, Ayman K. "The ‘right’ education in Israel: segregation, religious ethnonationalism, and depoliticized professionalism." Critical Studies in Education 59.1 (2018): 18-34 online.
 Al-Haj, Majid. Education, empowerment, and control: The case of the Arabs in Israel (Albany NY:  Suny Press, 2012).
 Argov, Eyal. "The Development of Education in Israel and its Contribution to Long-Term Growth" (No. 2016.15. Bank of Israel, 2016) online.
 Arar, Khalid. "Israeli education policy since 1948 and the state of Arab education in Israel." Italian Journal of Sociology of Education 4.1 (2012) online
 Feldman, Dar Halevy, and Adib Rifqi Setiawan. "Education in Israel." (2020) online.
 Feniger, Yariv, and Hanna Ayalon. "English as a gatekeeper: Inequality between Jews and Arabs in access to higher education in Israel." International Journal of Educational Research 76 (2016): 104-111 online.
 Hakak, Yohai, and Tamar Rapoport. "Excellence or equality in the name of God? The case of ultra-Orthodox enclave education in Israel." Journal of Religion 92.2 (2012): 251-276 online.
 Passow, A. Harry et al. The National Case Study: An Empirical Comparative Study of Twenty-One Educational Systems.  (1976) online
 Pinson, Halleli, and Ayman K. Agbaria. "Neo-liberalism and practices of selection in Arab education in Israel: Between control and empowerment." Diaspora, indigenous, and minority education'' 9.1 (2015): 54-80.

External links
Publications on Education by the Israel Central Bureau of Statistics